Our Lady of Tà Pao Statue is a statue located in Dong Kho, Tánh Linh District, Bình Thuận Province, Vietnam. It is one of five Our Lady statues placed in Central, Southern and Central Highlands section of Vietnam in 1959 by Ngô Đình Diệm. This Marian statue is cast in white cement, 3m high, set on a square pedestal 2m high.

September 29, 1999, the Archangel day, some Catholic parishioners Phuong Lam and surrounding areas, then act as Doc Mo, Gia Kiem, Ho Nai, and Ho Chi Minh City... flush down the region bordering the Tanh Linh and Phuong Lam desire is witnessed strange phenomena such as words of three pupils in previous methods. They saw that the Our Lady and she fly on the other side of the mountain. Since early 2000, many groups of people rushed to Tà Pao Mount to pilgrimage. Since then, many Catholics have been recounted many stories around the Our Lady of Tà Pao Statue.

Catholic Church in Vietnam
Statues of the Virgin Mary
1959 sculptures
Sculptures in Vietnam